Mast cell stabilizers are medications used to prevent or control certain allergic disorders. They block mast cell degranulation, stabilizing the cell and thereby preventing the release of histamine and related mediators. One suspected pharmacodynamic mechanism is the blocking of IgE-regulated calcium channels. Without intracellular calcium, the histamine vesicles cannot fuse to the cell membrane and degranulate.

As inhalers they are used to treat asthma, as nasal sprays to treat hay fever (allergic rhinitis) and as eye drops for allergic conjunctivitis. Finally, in oral form, they are used to treat the rare condition of mastocytosis.

Examples
Mast cell stabilizer medications include:
 β2-adrenergic agonists
 Cromoglicic acid
 Ketotifen
 Loratadine
 Desloratadine
 Methylxanthines 
 Olopatadine
 Rupatadine
Mepolizumab
 Omalizumab
 Pemirolast
 Quercetin
 Nedocromil
 Azelastine
 Tranilast
 Palmitoylethanolamide
 Vitamin D
 Bilastine

References